DC Releases was a monthly promotional newsletter published by DC Comics from 1984 to 1988.

Background
DC Releases was a replacement for DC's previous promotional newsletter, Coming Attractions, and ran for 48 issues. In 1988, it was replaced by Direct Currents.

The format of DC Releases was a four-page, 8.5" by 11" pamphlet, similar to Coming Attractions. It was printed in black and white (although early issues would use a color surprint), on white (and later, color) paper. The first page featured a story about one or more DC Comics titles being released that month. The other three pages would contain additional articles and a list of that month's new releases. For several issues, DC Releases contained interviews with DC staff, conducted by Lynn Vannucci. Each issue was distributed free of charge by local comic book shops.

List of issues

See also
 Comic Shop News
 Marvel Age

References

DC Comics titles
1984 comics debuts